The J. C. Penney Company Building  located at 104 S. Rail Street in Shoshone, Idaho, is a historic department store building. It was built in 1918 by stonemason Ignacio Berriochoa.

The building was identified in a Thematic Resource study, "Lava Rock Structures in South Central Idaho thematic group", and it was listed on the National Register of Historic Places on September 8, 1983.

See also
J. C. Penney

References

External links

Buildings and structures in Lincoln County, Idaho
Commercial buildings completed in 1918
Commercial buildings on the National Register of Historic Places in Idaho
Economy of Idaho
Department stores on the National Register of Historic Places
JCPenney
National Register of Historic Places in Lincoln County, Idaho
Lava rock buildings and structures